Witness Insecurity (護花危情) is a modern TV drama produced by TVB and starring Linda Chung and Bosco Wong. The series was originally announced to be a spin-off of the 2011 series Yes, Sir. Sorry, Sir! featuring the popular character "Miss Cool" portrayed by Chung. A costume fitting press conference was held on 21 November 2011 at Tseung Kwan O TVB City Studio One Common Room at 12:30PM.

Overview
Hui Wai-Sam (Bosco Wong) is a Witness Protection Unit (WPU) officer whose team is assigned to protect the cellist Hailey Kiu Chi-Lam (Linda Chung), the daughter of a wealthy businessman Kiu Kong-San (Paul Chun), when Chi-Lam witnesses the assassin who attempted to kill Kong-San's brother Kiu Kong-Ho.

Because she had witnessed the death of her brother at a young age, Chi-Lam has since suffered from guilt and depression. Believing herself to be responsible for her brother's death, she gradually became anti-social and use her music to isolate herself from others.  Wai-Sam's appearance in her life causes Lam to expand her horizons and she becomes much happier.  Despite her father's opposition, Chi-Lam begins to pursue a romantic relationship with Wai-Sam.

As Wai-Sam works for the police, Kong-San is hesitant to allow Chi-Lam to continue her relationship with Wai-Sam because Wai-Sam's position could ruin Kong-San's status.  To complicate matters further, his long-time enemy Lai Sue-Fung (Joseph Lee) reappears and threatens to unravel the origins of how Kong-San obtained his wealth.  When Wai-Sam discovers the connection between Kong-San and Sue-Fung, he is torn between his duty to do what is just and his love for Chi-Lam.

Cast

Main cast

Other cast

Awards and nominations
2012 TVB Anniversary Awards
Nominated(Top 5): Best Drama
Nominated(Top 10): Best Actor (Bosco Wong)
Nominated(Top 5): Best Actress (Linda Chung)
Nominated(Top 10): Best Supporting Actor (Ram Chiang)
Nominated(Top 10): My Favourite Male Character (Bosco Wong)
Nominated(Top 5): Most Improved Female Artiste (Cilla Kung)

Viewership ratings
The following is a table that includes a list of the total ratings points based on television viewership.

International broadcast
  - 8TV (Malaysia)
 - Channel 8

References

TVB dramas
Hong Kong television shows
Hong Kong romance television series
2012 Hong Kong television series debuts
2012 Hong Kong television series endings
Television series about witness protection
2010s romance television series
2010s Hong Kong television series